Fudbalski klub Igman Konjic, commonly referred to as FK Igman Konjic or simply Igman Konjic, is a professional association football club from the city of Konjic that is situated in Bosnia and Herzegovina.

Igman currently plays in the Premier League of Bosnia and Herzegovina and plays its home matches on the Stadion Igmana in Konjic, which has a capacity of 5,000 seats.

Honours

Domestic

League
First League of the Federation of Bosnia and Herzegovina:
 Winners (1): 2021–22
Second League of the Federation of Bosnia and Herzegovina:
 Winners (5): 2005–06 , 2008–09 , 2012–13 , 2015–16 , 2016–17   (record)

Cups
Bosnia and Herzegovina Cup:
Semi-finalists (1): 2021–22

Players

Current squad

Club seasons
Source:

Managerial history
 Fahrudin Zejnilović (1 July 2002 – 30 June 2003)
 Edin Prljača (1 July 2003 – 30 June 2004)
 Velibor Pudar (1 July 2009 – 30 June 2010)
 Adis Obad (2 July 2013 – 8 September 2014)
 Faik Kolar (26 December 2014 – 30 June 2015)
 Adis Obad (9 July 2017 – 5 April 2018)
 Nedim Jusufbegović (6 April 2018 – 10 May 2019)
 Emir Tufek (13 May 2019 – 30 June 2019)
 Fadil Hodžić (21 June 2019 – 22 September 2020)
 Milomir Šešlija (23 September 2020 – 6 April 2021)
 Adnan Elezović (6 April 2021 – 22 December 2022)
 Husref Musemić (22 December 2022 – present)

References

External links
FK Igman Konjic at Facebook

 
Konjic
Association football clubs established in 1920
Football clubs in Bosnia and Herzegovina
FK Igman Konjic